The Women's team sabre event of the 2018 World Fencing Championships was held on 26 and 27 July 2018.

Draw

Finals

Top half

Section 1
Round of 32

Section 2

Bottom half

Section 3
Round of 32

Section 4
Round of 32

Placement rounds

5–8th place bracket

9–16th place bracket

13–16th place bracket

References

2018 World Fencing Championships
World